Abzurdah is a 2015 Argentine biographical drama film directed by Daniela Goggi, based on the autobiographical novel of the same name by Cielo Latini. The film stars Eugenia China Suárez and Esteban Lamothe.

Premise
Cielo is a teenage student from the city of La Plata who meets Alejo, a man ten years older than her, a native of Avellaneda, with whom she begins a relationship and falls madly in love. Submerged in a superficial environment, without friends and in an adult world that understands little of the adolescent universe, the relationship becomes an obsession for Cielo, a loquacious, incisive and dizzying narrator, who leads us through a history of unrequited love where the option to stop eating becomes the illusion of a perfect life. But then, it shows how Cielo managed to heal and find happiness.

Cast
 Eugenia China Suárez as Cielo Latini
 Esteban Lamothe as Alejo
 Gloria Carrá as Miriam
 Rafael Spregelburd as Eduardo
 Paula Kohan as  Romina
 Tomás Ottaviano as Federico
 Malena Sánchez as Pilar
 Fernando Dente as Lucas
 Zoe Hochbaum as

Reception

Critical response
Abzurdah received mixed reviews from specialized critics. Javier Porta Fouz from the newspaper La Nación said in his review of the film: "We are dealing with a character that exists, which is clearly, that is imposed in situations that intensify but do not end up putting together a story with tension or with special fluency." In addition, Juan Pablo Cinelli of the newspaper Página 12 said, "A film that can be compared to a handful of sand: blunt, rough and abundant at the beginning, but as the story progresses it can not avoid slipping slowly between the fingers." On the other hand, Horacio Bilbao of the Clarín newspaper adds, "The promissory debut of China Suárez [...] and the rarefied love story that accentuates its crisis, allows Daniela Goggi (fundamental to direct a woman) to escape of the calculation of marketing."

More generally, Ezequiel Boetti from the Other Cinema site said: "It is true that cinema is not a question of intentions but of concrete results in the form of images and sounds captured on the screen, but it is impossible to approach Abzurdah without thinking that could have been a much better movie than it finally is."

Box office
The film in Argentina was an absolute success at the box office. The day of its premiere was seen by more than 30,000 spectators on 122 screens. Just a week after its premiere, it was seen by more than 240,000 spectators, being first in the national box office and becoming the best national opening of the first semester of 2015. At the moment, the film has been seen by more than 784,717 people.

Home video
The film was released on home video on 28 October 2015 in Argentina. It was edited by SP Films and distributed by Blu Shine SRL. Its special features include Spanish 5.1 audio, wide-screen screen, subtitles in English and Spanish and region 1 and 4. The DVD includes as extras the teaser, the trailer, the film's video clip and making-of.

In February 2017, always in his native country, Transeuropa reissued and released the film with the same characteristics of the previous DVD, except that it does not include the teaser as an extra.

References

External links
 
 Abzurdah at Cinenacional.com 

2015 biographical drama films
2015 films
2010s teen drama films
Argentine biographical drama films
Argentine romantic drama films
Films about eating disorders
Films based on Argentine novels
Films based on autobiographical novels
Films set in the 1990s
Films set in the 2000s
Films set in Argentina
Films shot in Argentina
Juvenile sexuality in films
2010s Argentine films